Xipu (Mandarin: 西堡镇) or Xibao is a town in Huangzhong District, Xining, Qinghai, China. In 2010, Xipu had a total population of 23,131: 11,921 males and 11,210 females: 4,575 aged under 14, 16,952 aged between 15 and 65 and 1,604 aged over 65.

References 
 

Township-level divisions of Qinghai
Xining
Towns in China